Block Party is a 2022 American comedy film directed by Dawn Wilkinson, starring Antoinette Robertson, Margaret Avery, Golden Brooks, Birgundi Baker, Charlyne Yi, Gary Anthony Williams, Luenell, Bill Cobbs and John Amos.

Cast
 Antoinette Robertson as Keke McQueen
 Margaret Avery as Janice Sommers
 Golden Brooks as Tasha McQueen
 Birgundi Baker as Eboni
 Charlyne Yi as Alice
 Gary Anthony Williams as Sean
 Luenell as Debra
 Bill Cobbs as Uncle Jim
 John Amos as Dennis
 Ben Miliken as Ben
 Terayle Hill as Will Rencher
 Richard Hartley as Daryl
 Faizon Love as Gus
 Felonious Munk as DJ Dee Nutz
 Merle Dandridge as Crystal Maitland
 Carmella Riley as Fire Marshall Joy
 Brad William Henke as Buddy Frank

Release
The film was released in theatres on 8 June 2022 and on BET+ on 16 June.

Reception
Tim Cogshell of KPCC's FilmWeek called the film "so sweet" and praised Cobb's performance and his character, stating that he had "some of the funniest lines" in the film.

Monique Jones of Common Sense Media rated the film 3 stars out of 5, callling the film a "lighthearted way to celebrate Juneteenth", and the cast "competent".

Katie Walsh of TheWrap called the film a "lightweight comedy that frustrates because there’s the potential for it to be great, to resonate beyond its blandly formulaic charms."

References

External links
 
 

American comedy films
2022 comedy films